"Emo Girl" (stylized in all lowercase) is a song by American musicians Machine Gun Kelly and Willow. Produced by Travis Barker, the song was released on February 4, 2022, as the second single off of Kelly's sixth studio album Mainstream Sellout, following "Papercuts".

Background
In 2021, musician Machine Gun Kelly had reported that he had worked on a collaboration with Willow Smith; at the time, the song had the working title of "Emo Prom". The song was first previewed on the January 30, 2022, on  Kelly's TikTok account, by the title "Cherry Red Lipstick". By February 4, the clip had amassed 17 million views. The full version of the song, now titled "Emo Girl", was released on February 4, just after Kelly had announced the song's respective album had been retitled from Born with Horns to Mainstream Sellout. The song features drumming, production, and a co-writing credit from Blink-182 drummer Travis Barker, who had previously collaborated with Kelly on his 2020 album Tickets to My Downfall. Barker had also previously collaborated on Willow's 2021 album Lately I Feel Everything.

Composition and themes
The song's sound was described as pop punk by multiple publications, being compared to the work of Blink-182, New Found Glory, and Bowling for Soup. As such, many also noted that it sounded like it could have been released in 2000's rock music scene. The track opens with a soundbite of Kelly's fiancé Megan Fox stating that she is a god, followed immediately by a "pop punk guitar riff". The soundbite comes from the 2009 film Jennifer's Body. The song then moves into lyrics that were described by Loudwire as a "laundry list of emo tropes" and as a mix between Blink 182's "The Rock Show" and Type O Negative's "Black No. 1". The song even references Blink-182 lyrically, with Willow singing about "bleeding on your Blink tee". Rolling Stone described the song musically as a mix between Avril Lavigne's "Sk8er Boi" and Good Charlottes "Riot Girl".

Reception
Billboard praised the song as being a good example of how Machine Gun Kelly and Willow had successfully rebranded themselves as part of the 2020s pop punk revival, stating that the song "functions as a summit of artists hoisting up their rock cred in joyful unison". NME called it a stand out song on Mainstream Sellout, praising Baker and Smith's chemistry, saying they bounce off each other. Clash said it has bucketloads of charm. Rolling Stone called it a "gleefully derivative" song that shows that "when Kelly reins in his yelp tiks, the buzzsaw bubblegum sticks". Other publications were more critical about the song's lack of originality. Loudwire found the lyrics to "pander[ing] to scenesters", while The Daily Californian complained of its "vapid lyricism and repetitive chorus." Wall of Sound felt that despite its "highly infectious melody", the song was ultimately annoying. BrooklynVegan called it "a thoughtless, generic song that even a C-list pop punk band would've left on the cutting room floor in the mid 2000s." Far Out Magazine called it terrible but admitted that it is still catchy. Pitchfork felt that it is too "serious to laugh at itself and too absurd to take seriously." Sputnikmusic called Smith the best part of the song, stating that unlike Baker she can actually sing.

Personnel
 Machine Gun Kelly – vocals, songwriting
 Travis Barker – drums, production, songwriting
 Willow Smith – vocals, songwriting
 Brandon Allen – production, songwriting
 Nick Long – songwriting
 Stephen Basil – songwriting

Charts

Weekly charts

Year-end charts

Certifications

Release history

References

2022 songs
2022 singles
Machine Gun Kelly (musician) songs
Willow Smith songs
Bad Boy Records singles
Interscope Records singles
Song recordings produced by Travis Barker
Songs written by Machine Gun Kelly (musician)
Songs written by Willow Smith